Sciara may refer to:

Sciara (fly), a genus of fungus gnats
Sciara sheep, a breed of sheep from Calabria, Italy
Sciara, Sicily, a town on Sicily
Sciara del Fuoco, a lava flow on Stromboli, Italy